The Guv'nor and Other Short Stories (Collins, 1932) is a short story compilation by the British crime writer Edgar Wallace.

These are the final stories about Mr. J. G. Reeder, a police officer with "the mind of a criminal".  
They include
"The Guv'nor" 
"The Man Who Passed" ("The Man from Sing Sing")
"The Shadow Man" 
"The Treasure House"

In America the book was published as Mr. Reeder Returns (The Crime Club, Doubleday, Doran, 1932) with the stories in a different order:  
"The Guv'nor", 
"The Man from Sing Sing", 
"The Treasure House", and 
"The Shadow Man".

A later (1965) edition Mr. J. G. Reeder Returns contains only "The Treasure House" and "The Shadow Man". The 1969 imprint was a tie in with the 1969 Thames Television  series The Mind of Mr. J.G. Reeder, starring Hugh Burden.

References
 The Detective Short Story; A Bibliography by Ellery Queen (Little, Brown and Company, 1942, p. 111)
 

British short story collections
1932 short story collections
Works by Edgar Wallace
Detective fiction short story collections
William Collins, Sons books